William McAdam Nickle (January 4, 1897 – December 10, 1968) was an Ontario political figure. He represented Kingston in the Legislative Assembly of Ontario from 1951 to 1963 as a Progressive Conservative member.

He was born in Kingston, Ontario, the son of William Folger Nickle, and educated there and at Osgoode Hall. In 1925, he married Grace Dunlop. He served with the Princess Patricia's Canadian Light Infantry and was wounded in World War I. Nickle served in the provincial cabinet as Provincial Secretary and Registrar in 1955, Minister of Planning and Development from 1955 to 1961 and Minister Without Portfolio from 1961 to 1962. He died at his home after a long illness in 1968.

References 

 Canadian Parliamentary Guide, 1952, GP Normandin

External links

1897 births
1968 deaths
Progressive Conservative Party of Ontario MPPs
Provincial Secretaries of Ontario